Johan Schåltz (born 27 August 1953) is a Swedish judoka. He competed in the men's half-heavyweight event at the 1976 Summer Olympics.

References

1953 births
Living people
Swedish male judoka
Olympic judoka of Sweden
Judoka at the 1976 Summer Olympics
Sportspeople from Stockholm
20th-century Swedish people